Worship Central is a British Christian music praise and worship charity from Birmingham, United Kingdom, founded at Holy Trinity Brompton in 2006 by Tim Hughes and Al Gordon. The charity exists to train worship pastors for churches as well as writing and producing new music for churches.

Background 
The charity was founded in 2006 out of London, United Kingdom, where they were located at Holy Trinity Brompton, while now they are based at Gas Street Church. Notable staff members and associate songwriters include Tim Hughes, Ben Cantelon, Al Gordon and Luke Hellebronth.

History 
Worship Central released their first album, Lifting High, in 2009, then Spirit Break Out, in 2011, Counting On Your Name, also in 2011, Let It Be Known in 2012, Set Apart in 2014, Mercy Road in 2017 and Stir A Passion in 2018.

Their albums have been recorded by the labels Integrity Music and Capitol Records. Let It Be Known reached number 45 in the UK Official Album Charts and lasted a record five weeks at number 1 at the Official Christian And Gospel Chart

Discography

References

External links 
 Official website
 Worship Together Profile

British Christian musical groups
Musical groups established in 2006
2006 establishments in the United Kingdom